The Tinguirirican age is a period of geologic time (36.0–29.0 Ma) within the Late Eocene and Early Oligocene epochs of the Paleogene, used more specifically within the SALMA classification in South America. It follows the Divisaderan and precedes the Deseadan age.

Etymology 
The age is named after the Tinguiririca fauna of the Abanico Formation in Chile.

Formations

Fossils

Correlations

References

Bibliography 
General
 

Abanico Formation
 
 
 
 
 
 

Chota Formation
 

Entre-Córregos Formation
 

Gualanday Group
 

Laguna Brava Formation
 

Loreto Formation
 
 
 
 

El Milagro Formation
 
 

Otuma Formation
 
 

Sarmiento Formation
 
 
 
 
 
 
 
 
 
 

Seca Formation
 

Soncco Formation
 

 
Oligocene South America
Paleogene Chile